Buteni is a commune in Arad County, Romania. The river Crișul Alb flows nearby. Buteni commune lies in the Sebiș Basin, at the foot of the Cuiedului Hills. It is composed of four villages: Berindia (Borosberend), Buteni (situated at 72 km from Arad), Cuied (Köved) and Păulian (Gósd).

Population
According to the last census, the population of the commune counts 3472 inhabitants, out of which 97.9% are Romanians, 0.7% Hungarians, 0.7% Roma, 0.3% Germans and 0.4% are of other or undeclared nationalities.

History
The first documentary record of the locality Buteni dates back to 1387. Berindia was first mentioned in documents in 1553, Cuied in 1447 and Păulian in 1553.

Economy
Although the economy of the commune is mostly agricultural, it is well known in the region also for its zootechnic sector
based on sheep-farming and for its small industry. Besides, it is an important centre of handicrafts.

Tourism
In the future tourism can become a dominant economical branch. The archaeological site in Berindia, the traditional occupations and handicrafts, the costumes and products made by hand, as well as the development of the agro-tourism can turn the commune into an area with exceptional tourist attraction.

References

Communes in Arad County
Localities in Crișana